Isai Perarignar (Tamil: இசைப் பேரறிஞர்) is an award given to Tamil musicians every year by the Tamil Isai Sangam of Tamil Nadu, Southern India.

Details about the award
With the aim of promoting Tamil language songs in Tamil classical concerts, the Tamil Isai Sangam conducts a 12-day music festival in December every year. The festival is conducted in Chennai where a number of concerts are held during what is known as the December Season.
Tamil Isai Sangam selects an exemplary musician for that year. On the first day of the festival, it awards the title of "Isai Perarignar" along with a gold medal and a purse to the selected musician.

Recipients

References

Indian music awards
Tamil Nadu awards
1957 establishments in Madras State
Awards established in 1957